Current Opinion is a collection of review journals on various disciplines of the life sciences. They were acquired by Elsevier in 1997. Each issue of each journal, which all are published bimonthly, contains one or more themed sections edited by scientists who specialise in the field and invite authors to contribute reviews aimed at experts and non-specialists. Each journal aims to cover all the major recent advances in its topic area, and to direct readers to the most important original research.

Journals

See also 
 Current Opinion (Lippincott Williams & Wilkins)

References

External links 
 

Elsevier imprints
Elsevier academic journals
Publishing companies established in 1990
Review journals
Academic journal series